Mid-major is a term used in American NCAA Division I college sports, particularly men's basketball, to refer to athletic conferences that are not among the (the ACC, AAC, Big East, Big 10, Big 12, Pac-12, and SEC), which are alternatively referred to as "high majors". The term "mid-major" was coined in 1977 by Jack Kvancz, the head coach of men's basketball team at Catholic University.  NCAA neither acknowledges nor uses the terms "major" or "mid-major" to differentiate between Division I athletic conferences. Some schools and fans consider it offensive and derogatory.

Football

Because of the development of the now-defunct Bowl Championship Series in 1998, and the lack of a playoff format for the Football Bowl Subdivision prior to the College Football Playoff, the demarcation line between major and mid-major conferences was much clearer in college football than in other sports. The six conferences of the BCS each had guaranteed appearances in one of the four major bowl games (Rose Bowl, Fiesta Bowl, Orange Bowl, and Sugar Bowl), whereas mid-majors — the teams that were not in one of those six leagues — relied on an at-large bid or a high ranking to qualify for a major bowl. (The Notre Dame Fighting Irish football team, an independent, was an exception.) It was rare for any mid-major program to receive one of two at-large bids (or only one, if Notre Dame qualified) to one of the four major bowls, even if such a program completed a perfect season. The establishment of the BCS National Championship Game opened two additional at-large berths and mandated invites for mid-major schools above a certain ranking, which led to an increase in mid-major appearances in the four major bowls. Then conference realignment brought about the split of the Big East football conference. Schools that did not join a major conference from the Big East renamed it the American Athletic Conference (The American), while several non-football schools left and founded a new conference, purchasing the "Big East" name from the newly renamed American. With the advent of the College Football Playoff in 2014, the non-Power Five FBS conferences are usually referred to as "Group of Five" conferences rather than mid-majors. No mid-major ever qualified for the BCS title game.

Only one mid-major team has won a National Championship: the BYU Cougars, then in the Western Athletic Conference, won the 1984 championship on the strength of its perfect record and a win in the 1984 Holiday Bowl. BYU largely won the championship by default, since no other team had held an undefeated record, and there were still lingering doubts about the team deserving the honor because it was in a lesser conference. Since the establishment of the Bowl Alliance (and its successors the Bowl Championship Series and College Football Playoff), no mid-major team had ever been selected for the championship game or tournament until the 2021 Cincinnati Bearcats of The American were selected after an unbeaten regular season.  The Bearcats were defeated in the opening (semifinal) round 27-6 by the Alabama Crimson Tide.

Currently, the Group of Five football conferences are the American Athletic Conference, Conference USA, the Mid-American Conference, the Mountain West Conference, and the Sun Belt Conference. Several conferences that no longer sponsor football were considered mid-majors; two that existed in the BCS era were the Big West Conference and the Western Athletic Conference (which resumed football competition in the Football Championship Subdivision in 2021).

Mid-major schools have compiled a record of 9–6 in the major bowl games since the 2004 football season. Since 2004, only the 2005 and 2011 seasons did not see a mid-major team in one of the major bowl games. The 2010 Fiesta Bowl featured two unbeaten mid-majors (Boise State and TCU); this is the only time two mid-majors have qualified for top-tier bowls.  Prior to 2012, each of these teams entered its bowl undefeated, until Northern Illinois qualified following the 2012 season.  UCF qualified for the January 2014 Fiesta Bowl (following the 2013 season), in the final year of the BCS, because the American Athletic Conference retained the Big East's automatic slot in the BCS. The current arrangement of the New Year's Six bowl games mandates that the highest-ranked Group of Five conference champion be awarded a New Year's Six bowl berth. This has been most recently invoked for the 2021 Cotton Bowl Classic, which featured a Cincinnati team that became the first Group of Five team to be selected to a College Football Playoff semifinal. The 2018 season saw a controversy that also involved UCF, which went on to win the 2018 Peach Bowl and end the season as the only undefeated FBS team. The Knights were denied a CFP bid in favor of four teams which had all lost one game (two of which, Georgia and Alabama, had lost by double digits to the same Auburn team that UCF had defeated in the Peach Bowl).

The American Athletic Conference and Mountain West Conference have so far been the most successful of the Group of Five at placing their champions in major bowls, respectively doing so eight and five times. However, four of the MW's appearances were in the BCS era, when the conference now operating as The American was known as the Big East and was a primary BCS partner. The Western Athletic Conference, which no longer sponsors FBS football, has done so three times; both schools which went to major bowls as WAC champions now play football in the MW. The Mid-American Conference has done so once in the BCS era and once in the CFP era. Conference USA and the Sun Belt Conference have never qualified a champion for a BCS or New Year's Six bowl.

The mid-major teams that have qualified for the most major bowl games are Boise State and UCF, with three each. Boise State qualified twice while in the WAC and once in the Mountain West, and UCF has made all of its appearances while in The American. Cincinnati, TCU, and Utah have each done so twice. TCU and Utah are now members of "Power Five conferences"; TCU is now in the Big 12, qualified for the 2014 Peach Bowl and played for the national championship following the 2022 season while there, whereas Utah is currently in the Pac-12 and played in the Rose Bowl in 2022 and 2023. Cincinnati and UCF will join the Big 12 in 2023.

The American is widely considered the best football conference that is not in the Power 5. Since its reorganization and split from the Big East Conference in 2013 (and its corresponding expulsion from "BCS conference" status), they have sent five programs to New Year's Six bowl games: Houston in 2015, UCF in 2013, 2017, and 2018, Memphis in 2019, Cincinnati in 2020 and 2021, and Tulane in 2022. These programs have gone 4–4 in the games played to date. USF, UCF, Houston, Navy, Cincinnati, SMU, and Memphis, all American Conference teams, are very successful programs in FBS play. In 2017, UCF was the first team from The American to go undefeated; its schedule included two wins against Memphis (whose only two regular season losses came to UCF and was otherwise undefeated) and a win against USF (which had only one other loss besides UCF), and the team won its bowl game against #7 Auburn, a team which had beaten both CFP championship game teams (Alabama and Georgia) that year. The Knights also completed an unbeaten regular season in 2018, but lost to LSU in their bowl game after having lost McKenzie Milton, the quarterback who had led them in both 2017 and 2018, to a catastrophic knee injury in their final regularly scheduled game. Cincinnati also entered its bowl games unbeaten in both 2020 and 2021, but lost both times, narrowly to Georgia in 2020 and more convincingly to Alabama in 2021. However, three of the four American Conference members to have played in New Year's Six games, namely Cincinnati, Houston, and UCF, will join the Big 12 Conference in 2023.

The bowl game to host the most mid-major conference champions is the Fiesta Bowl, which has hosted at least one such team six times, with the 2010 edition (2009 season) involving two mid-majors. The Cotton Bowl Classic has featured a mid-major champion four times, and the Peach Bowl has done so three times, with all such games for both bowls taking place in the CFP era. The Sugar Bowl did so twice in the BCS era. The Rose Bowl Game and Orange Bowl each did so once in the BCS era.

Basketball
Typically, the term is used to refer to teams that are members of a conference other than the Power Five. Others believe the term uses an arbitrary litmus test, based on how many teams from a given conference qualify for the NCAA tournament in a "good" year, or how much success a given conference has had in the NCAA tournament, or even conference revenue and attendance.  The Big East Conference is not in the Power Five, but is considered a power conference in basketball, with the term "Power Six" sometimes used by media to describe the combination of the Power Five and Big East. Beyond that, other conferences such as the Atlantic-10 Conference, American Athletic Conference, Missouri Valley Conference and the Mountain West Conference, have sometimes been falsely branded as "high-majors". Additionally, one men's program outside of these conferences, West Coast Conference member Gonzaga, is now generally considered equivalent to a Power Six program despite its mid-major affiliation. ESPN's Kevin Connors currently defines men's basketball mid-majors as "programs outside the top 7 conferences (Power Five, Big East, AAC) and Gonzaga". Another ESPN journalist, Jeff Borzello, referred to Gonzaga in 2022 as a "power conference" program. ESPN is not the only major media outlet that does not consider Gonzaga men's basketball to be a mid-major program; CBS Sports journalist Matt Norlander, in his 2022–23 season preview of mid-major conferences and programs, explicitly called Gonzaga "not a mid-major". In 2022, Gonzaga has reportedly been in preliminary membership talks with three Power Six conferences—the Big East, Big 12, and Pac-12.

Given the sustained success of many so-called "mid-major" conferences, and especially that of the Gonzaga program, higher profile conferences find it more difficult to distinguish themselves with the "mid-major" and "major" labels, unless one takes into account the distinction of being in now-defunct BCS football playing conference. However, only one team from what is now a mid-major conference has won a national championship since the tournament expanded to 64 teams—UNLV in 1990 as a member of the Big West Conference. (Louisville won national titles in 1980 and 1986 as a member of the Metro Conference, one of the precursors to Conference USA and arguably a major basketball conference of that day.)

Swimming
Since 2002, CollegeSwimming.com has produced an objective ranking system for Mid-Major, Division I swimming programs.  Initiated by Clark Campbell, the poll has been used to provide attention to teams that were often targeted for elimination ostensibly for Title IX or budgetary reasons. Swimming, along with most other NCAA sports, fundamentally differs in its financial model from the so-called "revenue sports" of basketball and Division I FBS football. The NCAA classifies the latter two sports as "head-count" sports, which means that the total number of players that can receive any athletically-related financial aid from the school is limited. Because a partial scholarship counts fully against the head count, it means that in practice, scholarships are almost always awarded as full grants-in-aid. On the other hand, the NCAA classifies swimming as an "equivalency" sport, meaning that scholarships can be divided among a number of student-athletes. CollegeSwimming.com's definition of a mid-major institution takes this into account.  Though the lineup has changed, institutions eligible for the CollegeSwimming.com poll are those institutions that a) are not members of a Power Five conference, American Athletic Conference, Mountain West Conference, or Western Athletic Conference; or b) provide fewer than one-half of the allowable scholarships under the NCAA rules.

Current Poll

Key conferences

As a convenient shorthand, the term "high major" basketball conference is often synonymous with the college football Power Five conferences:
 Atlantic Coast Conference (ACC)
 Big 12 Conference
 Big Ten Conference
 Pac-12 Conference
 Southeastern Conference (SEC)

These leagues, along with the Big East, were the six so-called AQ ("automatic qualifying") conferences during the Bowl Championship Series (BCS) era in college football. Following the breakup of the Big East and end of the BCS era, the remaining five are the primary members of the College Football Playoff (CFP) structure that began in the 2014 season. The CFP is centered around a group of bowl games often called the "New Year's Six", with two of them hosting CFP semifinals each season in rotation. Football champions of these conferences are assured of a spot in a "New Year's Six" game, though not necessarily in a CFP semifinal.

The two leagues that resulted from the 2013 split of the original Big East Conference—the football-sponsoring American Athletic Conference and non-football Big East Conference—are often considered to be major basketball conferences as well. When the original league split along football lines, the seven non-FBS schools, plus Creighton, Butler, and Xavier, founded the current Big East while the three remaining FBS schools, Cincinnati, UConn, and Temple, became The American. In every year since the split, the "new" Big East has been ranked a top five basketball conference by leading analysts such as Ken Pomeroy.  Villanova won the men's basketball national championship in the 2015-2016 and 2017-2018 seasons.  The American has also found success, consistently ranking a top ten league. In the 2013–14 season, the first after the split, American member UConn won national titles in both men's and women's basketball. The American also includes several other historically major men's programs such as Cincinnati, Memphis, and Temple. UConn eventually left The American in 2020 to reunite with many of its historic rivals in the current Big East.

The term "mid-major" is sometimes used to describe all of the other 25 basketball-playing conferences not receiving automatic tie-ins to either the BCS or CFP. However, most of the time the term is specifically applied only to the non-CFP conferences that consistently produce quality NCAA Tournament teams (distinguishing them from the "low-major" conferences). Often the definition of a "mid-major" is a conference that garners only one bid to the NCAA tournament (its automatic bid, won by its conference tournament winner)  and no at large bids, all the while not garnering the attention and television dollars of a major conference.

Until the last decade, the Atlantic 10, Conference USA, the Mountain West Conference, and the Western Athletic Conference were widely considered to high-major conferences but a step below the level of the six major conferences. However, due to recent changes in membership in some conferences, as well as the sustained success of some "mid-major" conferences, most no longer consider the Atlantic 10 and Mountain West to be below the level of the CFP conferences in college basketball. One reason why is the 2012–2013 RPI (a rating used by the tournament selection committee), which in 2012–13 ranked the Mountain West as the third best conference in Division I (ahead of the ACC, Big 12, Pac-12, and SEC) and the Atlantic 10 seventh (ahead of the SEC). The strength of these two non-CFP conferences in men's college basketball in 2012–13 was not an aberration, given that in 2011–12 the Mountain West finished the year ranked fifth, and the Atlantic 10 ranked seventh, both ahead of the Pac-12. Given the rankings of these two leagues, as well as their prestige, performance, recent post-season results, national perception, exposure, attendance, and many other factors, most observers have trouble considering certain non-CFP conferences as "mid-majors".

So-called "mid-major" basketball programs generally belong to one of the following twenty-four conferences. Note that some of these conferences, including the Mountain West and the Atlantic 10, may be considered a "high-major" as opposed to a mid-major depending on whom one asks.

America East Conference (sometimes AmEast)
 ASUN Conference
Atlantic 10 Conference (A-10)
Big Sky Conference
Big South Conference
Big West Conference
Colonial Athletic Association (CAA)
Conference USA (C-USA)
Horizon League
Ivy League 
Metro Atlantic Athletic Conference (MAAC)
Mid-Eastern Athletic Conference (MEAC)
Mid-American Conference (MAC)
Missouri Valley Conference (MVC)
Mountain West Conference (MW)
Northeast Conference (NEC)
Ohio Valley Conference (OVC)
Patriot League
Southern Conference (SoCon)
Southland Conference (Southland)
Southwestern Athletic Conference (SWAC)
Summit League 
Sun Belt Conference (SBC)
West Coast Conference (WCC)
Western Athletic Conference (WAC)

Conference USA and the WAC both once had many strong basketball programs, but since 1999 WAC men's basketball has dropped in prestige due to members leaving for the American Athletic and Mountain West, respectively.

This list is not static from year to year, as many fail to agree which conferences are truly the majors and which are the mid-majors and/or low-majors during any given season. (The Big West and Ohio Valley Conference were previously included on this list; they finished the 2011-2012 season as the 21st and 25th, respectively, ranked conferences in the RPI.) Some still refuse to consider the Mountain West to be a "major" conference, despite outperforming several other "major" (BCS) conferences for the last several years in a row. There are many conferences (besides the six BCS conferences) that have regularly had teams advance to the Sweet Sixteen or beyond, regularly challenge for multiple NCAA Tournament bids, have multiple teams "buy" games from lower-ranked conferences, and have finished in the top 10 in conference attendance every year for the last decade. Additionally, as noted previously, Gonzaga is now seen as a major program despite its mid-major conference affiliation.

The basketball website Collegeinsider.com created its own definition of "mid-major" when it introduced a pair of end-of-season awards for outstanding mid-major individuals in college basketball: the Lou Henson Award for players (first presented in 2010) and Hugh Durham Award for coaches (first presented in 2005).  Since the 2013–14 season, players and coaches from the following conferences have been ineligible for these awards:
 All conferences that sponsor FBS football, except for the MAC and Sun Belt
 Atlantic 10
 Big East
Additionally, although Collegeinsider.com continues to include Gonzaga in its unofficial "Mid-Major Top 25" when warranted, it apparently no longer considers Gonzaga to be eligible for its "mid-major" awards. For example, in 2020–21, Gonzaga had no representatives on the Lou Henson All-America Team, consisting of the 25 players on the final watchlist for the Henson Award. This was despite three Gonzaga players (Corey Kispert, Jalen Suggs, Drew Timme) being consensus All-Americans in that season.

Members of these conferences were also generally ineligible for CollegeInsider.com Postseason Tournament, and remain so for that event's effective successor, The Basketball Classic.

In Division I women's basketball, the analytics website Her Hoop Stats created a similar definition of "mid-major" when it introduced the Becky Hammon Mid-Major Player of the Year Award in 2020. Currently, players from the Power Five conferences, plus the Big East, are ineligible for this award.

Issues mid-major programs face
Mid-major teams often have a difficult time scheduling major conference opponents, especially at home. Major conference teams usually will not schedule a high quality mid-major team, knowing that there is an uncomfortably high chance that they will lose (especially if the game is at the mid-major team's home court) and if the major team does win, there is often little benefit in media exposure for beating a non-major school.  Some major conference teams also believe that scheduling games with additional competitive teams isn't necessary for their current team's development, as they believe there will be enough "tough games" during conference play.  This phenomenon often manifests itself in major squads playing mostly lower ranked mid-major conference teams (while refusing schedule requests from better mid-major squads) in their out-of-conference schedules, thereby establishing very impressive records against lesser foes and bypassing higher quality mid-major teams in the process.

In recent years, the NCAA Tournament Selection Committee has stressed the importance of a team's strength of schedule (SOS) in the nonconference portion of their schedule. Teams with a low-ranked nonconference SOS have often been penalized in their seeding and in some cases not selected for the tournament at all.  In 2006, Florida State was left out of the tournament field in large part because its out-of-conference schedule was rated #316 out of 333 Division I teams.

The difficulty most mid-majors have in scheduling major conference opponents has a large effect on their ability to qualify for the NCAA basketball championship tournament and for the National Invitation Tournament. Often, mid-major teams with outstanding records are passed over for at-large berths in the NCAA Tournament in favor of teams from BCS conferences with mediocre records, based partly on the fact that the mid-major teams often have a lower strength of schedule. Without the ability to play more "major" opponents, most mid-majors have to stake their Tournament hopes on winning their conference's season-ending tournament (which promises an automatic berth in the NCAA Tournament) since the possibility of an at-large bid is often remote. Mid-majors that do make it into the tournament by winning their conference tournament are regularly placed in the lowest seeds (four of the eight play-in game seeds are reserved for mid-major conference champions), which effectively ensures they will be eliminated from the tournament quickly because they will have to face the strongest teams in the tournament in their first game. (No play-in game participant has ever defeated a 1 seed, and it was not until 2018 that any 16 seed had ever defeated a 1 seed.) To expand opportunities for mid-majors to play postseason basketball, some unofficial postseason tournaments have arisen, including the aforementioned CollegeInsider.com tournament and the College Basketball Invitational; however, as most of the schools are smaller, they may not be able to afford the entry fees for these pay-to-play tournaments, and a number of mid-major schools have policies prohibiting play in them.

The Gonzaga Bulldogs team faces a slightly different set of challenges. Since its Elite Eight appearance in 1999, it has successfully established itself as the closest thing to a major program in a mid-major conference, making the tournament field in every year since, even in years it failed to win the West Coast Conference tournament. Its position in a mid-major conference is no longer a primary issue with regard to making the tournament field, but is often perceived to adversely affect its tournament seeding. The Bulldogs typically play a nationally competitive nonconference schedule, frequently going on the road, and have proven themselves capable of defeating nationally prominent opponents. However, the relative weakness of the West Coast Conference (WCC) hurts Gonzaga's strength of schedule, which in turn lowers the Bulldogs' Ratings Percentage Index (RPI) (an important numerical criterion in tournament selection). Gonzaga's challenges were similar to those faced by Nevada-Las Vegas under Jerry Tarkanian, whose Running Rebels dominated a relatively weak Big West Conference (formerly the Pacific Coast Athletic Association) from 1974-92.

Xavier University is another program that had to overcome the mid-major label prior to joining the Big East.  On January 9, 2008, PG Drew Lavender was named the "Mid-Major Player of the Week" by Rivals.com but Lavender refused to accept the award making the case that Xavier was no longer a mid-major. This act caused many prominent journalists to debate if the Atlantic 10 is a mid-major conference or not. This quandary no longer applies to Xavier, as it joined the reconstituted Big East in 2013.

Some mid-major teams are now preferring to play "home" games in larger nearby arenas.  Gonzaga uses the Spokane Arena in its home city or KeyArena in Seattle for these larger-audience games.  Some mid-major and major conference teams have made the use of non-campus arenas permanent. Saint Bonaventure University, one of the smallest colleges in Division I, has regularly played games at Blue Cross Arena in Rochester and KeyBank Center in Buffalo.

The NCAA tournament selection for the 2006 men's tournament was surrounded by controversy related to mid-major programs. A number of teams from mid-major conferences had unprecedented success in the non-conference portions of their schedule, and were therefore ranked highly in the RPI throughout the season. A change in the NCAA's RPI rating process prior to the 2005 season also improved many of these teams' chances by changing from a formula that treated home and road wins and losses equally, to a formula that gave higher weight to road games. Because many BCS conference teams played no more than one or two non-conference games away from home, there was a de facto bolstering of RPI ratings for many mid-major teams, leading to speculation about how this "new" version of the RPI would be used in the selection process by the NCAA tournament selection committee. In spite of a new precedent being set by the committee by leaving the highest ranked RPI team ever, #21 Missouri State of the Missouri Valley Conference, out of the tournament field, some mid-majors with strong RPI's received at-large bids over lower-ranked BCS conference teams.  This prompted harsh criticism from sports writers and coaches of BCS conference teams that did not receive bids. This criticism flew in the face of the fact that the six BCS conferences still received more bids (32) from the committee than in most past years.  The mid-major conference teams that were selected went on to silence those critics when a record number (five) advanced to the "Sweet 16". Even more significantly, one of those teams, George Mason of the Colonial Athletic Association, made it to the Final Four.  In both the 2008 and 2009 NCAA tournaments, mid-major Siena had a strong showing, advancing to the second round with wins over Vanderbilt and Ohio State respectively. In the 2010 NCAA Division I men's basketball tournament, the Butler University Bulldogs reached the Final Four, becoming the 3rd mid-major to make the Final Four in the modern (1985–present) era. On April 3, they beat Michigan State of the Big Ten Conference to become the second mid-major to reach the national championship game since 1998.

The 2011 NCAA Division I men's basketball tournament was the first time since the tournament expanded to 64 teams in 1985 that two mid-majors met in the Final Four. The Butler University Bulldogs returned for their second consecutive appearance after winning the Southeast Regional in New Orleans as a #8 seed.  The Virginia Commonwealth University Rams of the Colonial Athletic Association advanced to their first Final Four appearance after winning the Southwest Regional in San Antonio as a #11 seed. VCU became the first team in history to win five games to reach the Final Four, winning the First Four round in its inaugural year. VCU tied LSU in 1986 and fellow CAA team, George Mason, in 2006 as the highest seed to reach the Final Four (#11).  The previous time two mid-majors advanced to the same Final Four was the 1979 NCAA Division I men's basketball tournament, when Indiana State of the Missouri Valley and Penn of the Ivy League qualified. Butler is no longer a mid-major due to its membership in the Big East since 2013. VCU has since joined the Atlantic 10, where it has consistently been among the top teams, even following the departure of coach Shaka Smart for Texas in 2015, and his successor, Will Wade, for LSU in 2017.

Mid-major basketball teams also face significant disadvantages when it comes to resources to spend on recruiting, marketing, and operations, including coaches' salaries. Mid-major basketball blogger Kyle Whellison, who describes as mid-major any team from a conference where average total spending on men's basketball programs is less than $2 million and average total spending on all athletic programs is less than $20 million, notes that teams from major conferences win games against teams from mid-major conferences roughly 84 percent of the time.

In unusual cases, teams may have reputations as mid-majors even if they participate in major conference. An example of this is Saint Bonaventure, one of the smallest universities in Division I; the Bonnies have been a member of the Atlantic 10 Conference (in which it has been a consistent contender under current coach Mark Schmidt). In 2016, the Bonnies were denied a bid into the NCAA Tournament because of their non-conference schedule; Saint Bonaventure has regularly scheduled rivalry games with the three other Western New York universities  in Division I (Buffalo, Canisius and Niagara), all of which are considered mid-majors. Their participation in a major conference, in turn, disqualifies the team from awards and tournament bids (such as the College Insider tournament mentioned above) reserved for mid-majors.

Footnotes

References

External links
Mid-Major basketball coaches poll

History of college basketball in the United States
NCAA Division I conferences